Moving Up is an American reality television series that aired on The Learning Channel. The show originally ran from January 29, 2005 to October 17, 2009.

Format 
Moving Up sees each episode a family moving out of their home and then a new family that has purchased the house moving in and renovating it to their desired home. The old family then sees the changes to their old homes and provides feedback. The show is hosted by Doug Wilson, and he visits the renovation in progress and provides commentary.

Production 
The Learning Channel first premiered the show in 2005 with series one consisting of fifteen episodes.

Episodes

Series overview

Season 1 (2005)

Season 2 (2005–2007)

Season 3 (2008)

Season 4 (2009)

References 

2000s American reality television series
Home renovation television series
2005 American television series debuts
2009 American television series endings